West Nodaway R-I School District is a school district headquartered in unincorporated Nodaway County, Missouri, near Burlington Junction.

In 2020 the West Nodaway School District agreed to enter into a sports cooperative program with Nodaway-Holt R-VII School District.

In 2020 the superintendent stated that the district may lay off some employees because it has too many employees unless it increases taxes. It had laid off four teachers earlier that year.

Schools
 West Nodaway High School

References

External links
 West Nodaway R-I School District

Education in Nodaway County, Missouri
School districts in Missouri